Craig Howard (January 29, 1952 – January 20, 2017) was an American football coach and former player. At the time of his death he was head football coach at Southern Oregon University, a position he had held since 2011. Howard served as the head football coach at Oregon Institute of Technology from 1990 until 1992, when the school dropped its football program. He was later a high school coach of Heisman Trophy winner Tim Tebow at Allen D. Nease High School in Ponte Vedra, Florida, where his team won the high school state championship. He led the Southern Oregon Raiders to the NAIA Football National Championship in 2014.

In 2017, Howard died at his home at the age of 64.

Head coaching record

College

References

External links
 Southern Oregon profile

1952 births
2017 deaths
Linfield Wildcats football players
Oregon Tech Hustlin' Owls football coaches
Portland State Vikings football coaches
Southern Oregon Raiders football coaches
West Alabama Tigers football coaches
High school football coaches in Florida
Sportspeople from Grants Pass, Oregon
Players of American football from Oregon